The Mascouche River is a river flowing in the municipality of Terrebonne, in Les Moulins Regional County Municipality (RCM), in the administrative region of Lanaudière, in Quebec, in Canada.

Geography 

Course of the river

Mascouche River rises in the area east slopes of Mirabel airport, draining various streams: Ouellet, Gascon-Forget, Cardinal Lapointe, Desjardins Hogue-Therrien and Saint Pierre River (Mirabel). From the airport area, the river:
  to the east, to Highway 15 (Autoroute des Laurentides);
In this segment, the river serpentine downstream of the village;
In this area, the river began to move towards the northeast;

Downstream course of the St. Pierre River

Mascouche River continues its course:
  to the highway bridge of Moorcrest sector Mascouche. From this area, the river is more towards the north;
  to the east, to Highway 25;
  to the east, to the bridge of the railroad,
  to the south-west to a channel arranged to achieve faster Mille Îles River;
  to the west to the mouth of the river located in the Old Terrebonne.

Toponymy
The minutes of Mathieu-Benoît Collet (1721), in the section on Jesus Island, including mention Maskoueche river. Variations: St. Marys River and Rivière Saint-Jean-Baptiste.

The place name "Mascouche River" was formalized December 5, 1968, at the Bank of place names of Commission de toponymie du Québec (Quebec Geographical Names Board).

See also 

 Sainte-Anne-des-Plaines, Quebec, a municipality
 Terrebonne, a city
 Mirabel, Quebec, a city
 Les Moulins Regional County Municipality (RCM)
 Rivière des Mille Îles, a stream
 Saint Pierre River (Mascouche), a river
 Saint Pierre River (Mirabel), a river

References 

Tributaries of the Saint Lawrence River
Rivers of Lanaudière